Garfield is a U.S. comic strip created by Jim Davis that has been the subject of numerous television specials and series. Many of these specials have been compiled on DVD releases. 

In June 2004, the DVD Garfield as himself, was released. DVD Talk critic Randy Miller judged the Garfield as himself specials to be "quite enjoyable." The DVD debuted 35th in sales. That year, Garfield Holiday Celebrations appeared 23rd in TV DVD sales for the week of November 10, 2007. In 2014, Entertainment Weekly reported copies of the DVD "were selling on eBay like rare collector’s items."

Garfield Holiday Collection was released on November 4, 2014, sold only by Walmart, and was also made available for digital download on November 11 that year. Davis explained that in compiling the DVD, he went beyond the holiday-themed specials to include personal favorites.

The content of Garfield DVDs varies between countries; listed below are all of the episodes linked to each release.

DVDs

Compilations

Series
Garfield and Friends releases:

References

Garfield mass media and merchandise
Lists of home video releases